Bannister is an unincorporated community in southwest Camden County, in the U.S. state of Missouri.

The community is on Missouri Route N 4.5 miles north of Macks Creek and 5.5 miles southeast of Climax Springs. The Little Niangua River flows past approximately one-half mile north of the site.

History
A post office called Bannister was established in 1893, and remained in operation until 1916. The community most likely was named after the Bannister family.

References

Unincorporated communities in Camden County, Missouri
Unincorporated communities in Missouri